Airin Rachmi Diany (born 1976) is an Indonesian politician who served as the mayor of South Tangerang from 2011 to 2021. She is also the aunt of Banten lieutenant governor Andika Hazrumy. She has led several initiatives to combat recruitment of people in her city by radical fundamentalist groups, including interfaith forums, with the support of Indonesia's federal government. She also commissioned a canal project in order to prevent flooding on the Jakarta–Serpong Toll Road in February 2017.

Diany won the People's Choice Award as well as the Miss Indonesia Tourism award at the 1996 Miss Universe Indonesia contest. Actress-turned-representative in the People's Representative Council, Nurul Arifin, pointed to Diany and Surabaya mayor Tri Rismaharini as her inspiration for running for mayor of Bandung.

References

1976 births
Indonesian beauty pageant winners
Indonesian female models
Indonesian Sunni Muslims
Living people
Puteri Indonesia winners
Politicians from West Java
Sundanese people
Mayors and regents of places in Banten
Women mayors of places in Indonesia
People from Banjar, West Java
Mayors of places in Indonesia